The 1998 Davis Cup World Group Qualifying Round was held from 25 to 28 September. They were the main play-offs of the 1998 Davis Cup. The winners of the playoffs advanced to the 1999 Davis Cup World Group, and the losers were relegated to their respective Zonal Regions I.

Teams
Bold indicates team had qualified for the 1999 Davis Cup World Group.

From World Group

 
 
 
 
 
 
 
 

 From Americas Group I

 
 

 From Asia/Oceania Group I

 
 

 From Europe/Africa Group I

Results summary
Date: 25–28 September

The eight losing teams in the World Group first round ties and eight winners of the Zonal Group I final round ties competed in the World Group Qualifying Round for spots in the 1999 World Group.

Qualifying results

Australia vs. Uzbekistan

Brazil vs. Romania

Czech Republic vs. South Africa

Israel vs. France

Great Britain vs. India

Netherlands vs. Ecuador

Japan vs. Russia

Argentina vs. Slovakia

References

External links
Davis Cup official website

World Group Qualifying Round